Yu Song (234 - 280), courtesy name Shilong, was an official of the Jin dynasty of China. He previously served in the state of Eastern Wu during the Three Kingdoms period. He wrote the Qiong Tian Lun (穹天論), an essay on astronomy.

Life
Yu Song was the sixth son of Yu Fan,  an official who served under Sun Quan, the founding emperor of Eastern Wu, and under Sun Quan's predecessor, Sun Ce. His ancestral home was in Yuyao County (餘姚縣), Kuaiji Commandery, which is in present-day Yuyao, Zhejiang. He was known for being honest, unpretentious and courteous. While he was in Wu, he assumed the following appointments: Colonel of Striding Cavalry (越騎校尉), Minister of Justice (廷尉), and Administrator (太守) of Xiangdong (湘東) and Hejian (河間) commanderies.

In 280, after Wu was conquered by the Jin dynasty, he went on to serve in the Jin government and was appointed as the Chancellor (相) of Hejian Principality (河間國). Sima Yong, the Prince of Hejian (河間王), had heard of Yu Song before and he treated him respectfully. Whenever he met and interviewed potential candidates to join the civil service, he did so in plain and simple buildings instead of in his office. Wang Qi (王岐), who was a friend of Yu Song's fifth brother Yu Zhong, tried to make things difficult for Yu Song by saying that elegant people possessed great talent. In response to Wang Qi's remark, Yu Song wrote to his nephew Yu Cha (虞察), "Those who recruit others to serve in the government had never ventured as far as into the countryside or society to search for talents. The ones who succeed are those they favour, while the ones who fail are those they do not favour. This is exactly what I always lament about."

Yu Song also strongly disapproved of lavish spending on funerals. When his eighth brother Yu Bing died, he offered only a lamb and some food and wine as sacrifices at his brother's funeral. His family and relatives followed this practice.

Family
Yu Song had 10 brothers. Among them, the notable ones were his fourth brother Yu Si, fifth brother Yu Zhong, and eighth brother Yu Bing.

See also
 Lists of people of the Three Kingdoms

References

 Chen, Shou (3rd century). Records of the Three Kingdoms (Sanguozhi).
 Fang, Xuanling (ed.) (648). Book of Jin (Jin Shu).
 Pei, Songzhi (5th century). Annotations to Records of the Three Kingdoms (Sanguozhi zhu).

Year of birth unknown
Year of death unknown
Eastern Wu politicians
Jin dynasty (266–420) politicians
Politicians from Ningbo
Jin dynasty (266–420) writers